Alamut-e Gharbi District (meaning "Western Alamut District"), formerly Rudbar-e Shahrestan District, is a district (bakhsh) in Qazvin County, Qazvin Province, Iran. At the 2006 census, its population was 16,255, in 4,667 families.  The District has one city: Razmian.  The District has three rural districts (dehestan): Rudbar-e Mohammad-e Zamani Rural District, Rudbar-e Shahrestan Rural District, and Dastjerd Rural District. According to some sources, the majority of people in northern Qazvin (Alamut) are Tats who speak a dialect of the Tati language. However, other sources claim that the majority of people in Alamut are Mazanderani or Gilaks who speak a dialect of the Mazanderani language or Gilaki language. According to some linguists, the term ‘Tati’ was used by Turkic speakers to refer to non-turkic speakers. This could explain why some sources claim the people of Alamut are Tats, while others claim they are Mazanderanies or Gilaks. Likely, the ‘Tats’ of Alamut are Mazanderani or Gilak speakers who have been labeled as Tats as historically they were considered Mazanderani or Gilaks.

References 

 The population of the western boundary of 21 thousand Alamut

Districts of Qazvin Province
Qazvin County